During the 2019–20 season, Greenock Morton are competing in the Scottish Championship the second tier of Scottish football, having finished 5th in the 2018–19 season. Morton will also compete in the Challenge Cup, Scottish League Cup and the Scottish Cup.

Results and fixtures

Scottish Championship

Scottish League Cup

Group E Table

Knouckout Round

Scottish Challenge Cup

Scottish Cup

Transfers

Transfers in

Transfers out

Loans in

Loans out

References 

Greenock Morton F.C. seasons
Greenock Morton